Century House, London is a 22-storey building located at 100 Westminster Bridge Road in London. The building was designed by P. M. Devereux and constructed between 1959 and 1964. It became the home of the Secret Intelligence Service following their move from 54 Broadway in 1964. Though the location of their Broadway headquarters was classified information, The Daily Telegraph reported that it was "London's worst-kept secret, known only to every taxi driver, tourist guide and KGB agent".

After 21 years in service as the headquarters of SIS, Century House was described as "irredeemably insecure" in a 1985 National Audit Office (NAO) report with several security concerns raised. Chief among those concerns was that the building was made largely of glass, and had a petrol station at its base. The Secret Intelligence Service moved its headquarters to Vauxhall Cross in 1994 and the Century House building was refurbished and converted into the residential Perspective Building, designed by Assael Architecture in 2001.

References

Buildings and structures in the London Borough of Southwark
Secret Intelligence Service